Artificial intelligence is the intelligence exhibited by machines and software.

Artificial intelligence may also refer to:

Music

Albums and EPs
 Artificial Intelligence (EP), or the title track, by Tom Cardy, 2021
 Artificial Intelligence (John Cale album), 1985
 Artificial Intelligence (series), a series of electronic music albums by Warp Records
 Artificial Intelligence (compilation album), the first in the series
 Artificial Intelligence, a 1997 album by the Wynona Riders

Songs
 "Artificial Intelligence", a song by Detroit Grand Pubahs from the 2001 album Funk All Y'all
 "Artificial Intelligence", a song by OneRepublic from the 2016 album Oh My My

Other uses
 A.I. Artificial Intelligence, a 2001 film directed by Steven Spielberg
 Artificial Intelligence (journal), a scientific journal
 Artificial intelligence in video games
 Artificial intelligence in fiction, an intelligent self-aware artifact
 Artificial Intelligence: A Guide for Thinking Humans, a 2019 book by Melanie Mitchell
 Artificial Intelligence: A Modern Approach, a 1995 book by Stuart J. Russell and Peter Norvig

See also
 Artificial intelligence in fiction
 Autonomic intelligence
 Expert system
 Fuzzy logic
 Heuristic (disambiguation)